George Bell (born 29 January 2002) is a New Zealand rugby union player, who plays for Crusaders.

Early life 
Growing up in rural Shag Valley, just outside Waihemo in East Otago, George Bell first played for the Eastern Rugby Football Club in Waikouaiti.

Having been an boarder in the John McGlashan College, Bell later joined the Lincoln University as he made it to the Crusaders academy.

Club career 
Will still yet to play provincial rugby, George Bell was awarded his Super Rugby debut for the Crusaders on the 7 May 2022, replacing Ricky Jackson and scoring a try on debut during this 53-13 win against Western Force in Perth.

International career 
George Bell is an under-20 international with New Zealand, having played 4 friendly games with the Baby blacks in 2021, against Wellington, Tasman, the Cook Islands and a Harlequins XV, as international junior competitions were halted by covid.

References

External link
 

2002 births
Living people
New Zealand rugby union players
Rugby union hookers
Crusaders (rugby union) players
People from Otago
Canterbury rugby union players